Clostridium hylemonae is a Gram-positive and anaerobic bacterium from the genus Clostridium which has been isolated from human faeces.

References

 

Bacteria described in 2000
hylemonae